London is an urban neighborhood of Belgrade, the capital of Serbia. It is located in Belgrade's municipality of Stari Grad, in city's downtown.

Location 

North of it is Andrićev Venac, short, artistic promenade (with artificial stream) dedicated to the novelist and Nobel prize laureate Ivo Andrić and the surrounding neighborhood which encompasses Novi Dvor, seat of the President of Serbia and one of the main pharmacies in Belgrade,1 Maj. Along the Kralja Milana Street is also a Park Aleksandrov on the north and Beograđanka, the tallest building in downtown Belgrade, on the south.

History

19th century 

The building of the new hotel was constructed at the crossroad in 1873. As the hotel was named "London", after the capital of the United Kingdom, soon the entire surrounding area became known as London, too. As the National Assembly of Serbia at that time was located one block away, at the crossroad of the Kraljice Natalije and Kneza Miloša streets, the main guest were the deputies during the parliamentary recesses. It was a humble, low and unrepresentative edifice, so sometimes the deputies held sessions in the "Kasina" hotel on the Terazije square.

In this period, London was the eastern border of urban Belgrade. The commercial zone, with grocery stores (čaršija), spread from Terazije to London, while from this point on, the gardens and fields extended to the east until the marshy pond where the Slavija Square is today, where local population went for duck hunting.

Across the London building, in the Masarikova Street, is the headquarters of the Belgrade electric company. The dispatch center was built from 1962 to 1968. The building is located on the very spot where the first electric light in Belgrade was lit in 1882. At that time it was the "Proleće" kafana, later renamed to "Hamburg".

20th century 

The hotel was later closed due to the ruining in 1962 and the kafana, later modern restaurant, was opened instead. In the 1980s, a popular disco club "London" was opened in the building.

In 1992 the restaurant was turned into one of the branches of the "Dafiment banka", one of two major pyramid schemes in Serbia (the second has been "Jugoskandic"). After the collapse of "Dafiment", London was turned into a casino, later into a wine club. As of 2019, it hosts one of the supermarkets of the Idea retail chain. Still, all venues always had name London in their names: Restoran London, Casino London, Idea London, etc.

References 

Neighborhoods of Belgrade
Stari Grad, Belgrade